The Martin Bridge is a road bridge that carries the Manning River Drive across the Manning River in Taree, in the Mid North Coast region of New South Wales, Australia. In 2010 the bridge was added to New South Wales State Heritage Register.

Description 
Originally it had a lifting span with two concrete counterbalances. The bridge was opened on 18 May 1940 by the Premier of New South Wales, Alexander Mair, and replaced a steam-driven timber ferry service, in operation since 1902, located at the end of Pulteney Street (the redundant section of approach road on the southern bank of the Manning River leading to the ferry was renamed Old Punt Road). The construction cost was A£97,000.

The article stated that:

The bridge is named in honour of Lewis Martin, the Member for Oxley and the Minister for Works and Local Government at the time of construction. The bridge was the major piece of engineering on a deviation of the Pacific Highway from the previous crossing of the Manning River upstream at Tinonee. The location of the crossing of the Manning River by the Pacific Highway was changed yet again in December 1997 when the Taree bypass opened and two bridges, namely the Ella Simon Bridge and the Henry "Hawkeye" Edwards Bridge, that crossed the Manning River via Dumaresq Island. As a result, most of the traffic now carried by the Martin Bridge is local traffic.

See also 

 List of bridges in Australia
 Manning River railway bridge, Taree

References

External links
 Bridge on the NSW Road and Traffic Authority webpage

Road bridges in New South Wales
Taree
1940 establishments in Australia
Bridges completed in 1940
Steel bridges in Australia
Truss bridges in Australia